List of champions of the 1898 U.S. National Championships tennis tournament (now known as the US Open). The men's tournament was held from 15 August to 22 August on the outdoor grass courts at the Newport Casino in Newport, Rhode Island. The women's tournament was held from 14 June to 18 June on the outdoor grass courts at the Philadelphia Cricket Club in Philadelphia, Pennsylvania. It was the 18th U.S. National Championships and the second Grand Slam tournament of the year.

Finals

Men's singles

 Malcolm Whitman defeated  Dwight F. Davis  3–6, 6–2, 6–2, 6–1

Women's singles

 Juliette Atkinson defeated  Marion Jones  6–3, 5–7, 6–4, 2–6, 7–5

Men's doubles
 Leo Ware /  George Sheldon defeated  Holcombe Ward /  Dwight Davis 1–6, 7–5, 6–4, 4–6, 7–5

Women's doubles
 Juliette Atkinson /  Kathleen Atkinson defeated  Marie Wimer /  Carrie Neely 6–1, 2–6, 4–6, 6–1, 6–2

Mixed doubles
 Carrie Neely /  Edwin P. Fischer defeated  Helen Chapman /  J.A. Hill 6–2, 6–4, 8–6

References

External links
Official US Open website

 
U.S. National Championships
U.S. National Championships (tennis) by year
U.S. National Championships
U.S. National Championships
U.S. National Championships
U.S. National Championships
U.S. National Championships